This is a list of high schools in the state of New Mexico.

Bernalillo County

East Mountain High School, Sandia Park
To'Hajilee High School, Canoncito

Albuquerque

Public/Magnet Schools

Albuquerque High School
Atrisco Heritage Academy
Career Enrichment Center/Early College Academy
Cibola High School
College & Career High School
Del Norte High School
Eldorado High School
Freedom High School
Highland High School
La Cueva High School
Manzano High School
Nex+Gen Academy
Rio Grande High School
Sandia High School
School on Wheels Magnet School
Valley High School
Volcano Vista High School
West Mesa High School

Charter Schools

ABQ Charter Academy
ACE Leadership High School
Albuquerque Talent Development Academy
Albuquerque Institute for Mathematics and Science
Amy Biehl High School
Corrales International School
Cottonwood Classical Preparatory School
Digital Arts & Technology Academy (DATA)
eCADEMY Alternative School
El Camino Real Academy
Health Leadership High School
La Academia de Esperanza Charter School
Los Puentes Charter School
Mark Armijo Charter Academy
Native American Community Academy
New Mexico Academy for the Media Arts
Public Academy for Performing Arts
Robert F. Kennedy High School
South Valley Academy
Southwest Secondary Learning Center
Technology Leadership High School

Private Schools

Albuquerque Academy
Bosque School
Designs for Learning Differences (DLD) Sycamore School
Hope Christian School
Menaul School
St. Pius X High School
Sandia Preparatory School

Catron County
Quemado Elementary and High School, Quemado
Reserve High School, Reserve

Chaves County
Early College High School, Roswell
Dexter High School, Dexter
Gateway Christian School, Roswell
Goddard High School, Roswell
Hagerman High School, Hagerman
Lake Arthur High School, Lake Arthur
New Mexico Military Institute, Roswell
Roswell High School, Roswell
University High School, Roswell
Valley Christian Academy, Roswell

Cibola County
Grants High School, Grants
Laguna Acoma High School, New Laguna
Pine Hill High School, Pine Hill

Colfax County
Cimarron High School, Cimarron
Maxwell High School, Maxwell
Moreno Valley High School, Angel Fire
Raton High School, Raton
Springer High School, Springer

Curry County
Clovis Christian School, Clovis
Clovis High School, Clovis
Grady High School, Grady
Melrose High School, Melrose
Texico High School, Texico

De Baca County
Fort Sumner High School, Fort Sumner

Doña Ana County
Arrowhead High School, Las Cruces
Centennial High School, Las Cruces
Chaparral High School, Chaparral
Early College High School, Las Cruces/University Park
Gadsden High School, Anthony
Hatch Valley High School, Hatch Valley
Las Cruces High School, Las Cruces
Las Montanas High School, Las Cruces
Mayfield High School, Las Cruces
Mesilla Valley Vocational Training High School, Las Cruces
Mesilla Valley Christian School, Las Cruces
Oñate High School, Las Cruces
San Andres High School, Mesilla
Santa Teresa High School, Santa Teresa

Eddy County
Artesia High School, Artesia
Carlsbad High School, Carlsbad
Loving High School, Loving

Grant County
Cliff High School, Cliff
Cobre High School, Bayard
Silver High School, Silver City
 Aldo Leopold Middle & High Charter school, Silver City

Guadalupe County
Santa Rosa High School, Santa Rosa
Vaughn High School, Vaughn

Harding County
Mosquero High School, Mosquero
Roy High School, Roy

Hidalgo County
Animas High School, Animas
Lordsburg High School, Lordsburg

Lea County
Eunice High School, Eunice
Hobbs High School, Hobbs
Jal High School, Jal
Lovington High School, Lovington
Tatum High School, Tatum

Lincoln County
Capitan High School, Capitan
Carrizozo High School, Carrizozo
Corona High School, Corona
Gavilan Canyon Alternative, Ruidoso
Hondo High School, Hondo
Sierra Blanca Christian Academy, Ruidoso
Ruidoso High School, Ruidoso

Los Alamos County
Los Alamos High School, Los Alamos

Luna County
Deming High School, Deming

McKinley County
Crownpoint High School, Crownpoint
Gallup Catholic High School, Gallup
Gallup High School, Gallup
Middle College Charter High School, Gallup
Miyamura High School, Gallup
Navajo Pine High School, Navajo
Ramah High School, Ramah
Rehoboth Christian School, Rehoboth
Thoreau High School, Thoreau
Tohatchi High School, Tohatchi
Tsé Yí Gai High School, Pueblo Pintado
Twin Buttes High School, Zuni
Wingate High School, Fort Wingate
Zuni High School, Zuni

Mora County
Mora High School, Mora
Valmora High School, Valmora
Wagon Mound High School, Wagon Mound

Otero County
Alamogordo High School, Alamogordo
Cloudcroft High School, Cloudcroft
Mescalero Apache High School, Mescalero
Tularosa High School, Tularosa

Quay County
House High School, House
Logan High School, Logan
San Jon High School, San Jon
Tucumcari High School, Tucumcari

Rio Arriba County
Coronado High School, Gallina
Dulce High School, Dulce
Escalante High School, Tierra Amarilla
Española Military Academy, Española
Española Valley High School, Española
McCurdy Charter School, Española

Roosevelt County
Dora High School, Dora
Elida High School, Elida
Floyd High School, Floyd
Portales High School, Portales

San Juan County
Aztec High School, Aztec
Bloomfield High School, Bloomfield
Career Prep High School, Shiprock
Farmington High School, Farmington
Kirtland Central High School, Kirtland
Navajo Preparatory School, Farmington
Newcomb High School, Newcomb
Piedra Vista High School, Farmington
Rocinante High School, Farmington
Shiprock High School, Shiprock
Shiprock Northwest High School, Shiprock

San Miguel County
Armand Hammer United World College of the American West, Montezuma
Las Vegas Christian Academy, Las Vegas
Pecos High School, Pecos
Robertson High School, Las Vegas
West Las Vegas High School, Las Vegas

Former
Native American Prep School, Rowe

Sandoval County
Bernalillo High School, Bernalillo
Cuba High School, Cuba
Independence High School, Rio Rancho
Jemez Valley High School, Jemez Pueblo
Rio Rancho High School, Rio Rancho
Sandia View Academy, Corrales
V. Sue Cleveland High School, Rio Rancho (2009)

Santa Fe County
Academy for Technology and the Classics Charter School, Santa Fe
Capital High School, Santa Fe
Charter School 37, Lamy
Desert Academy, Santa Fe
Early College Opportunities, Santa Fe
Monte del Sol Charter School, Santa Fe
New Mexico Academy for Sciences and Mathematics
Pojoaque Valley High School, Pojoaque
St. Michael's High School, Santa Fe
Santa Fe High School, Santa Fe
Santa Fe Indian School, Santa Fe
Santa Fe Preparatory School, Santa Fe
Santa Fe Secondary School, Santa Fe
Santa Fe Waldorf High School, Santa Fe
The Tutorial School, Santa Fe

Sierra County
Hot Springs High School, Truth or Consequences

Socorro County
AIM High, Socorro
Alamo Navajo High School, Alamo
Magdalena High School, Magdalena
Socorro High School, Socorro

Taos County
Chamisa Mesa High School, Ranchos de Taos
Mesa Vista High School, Ojo Caliente
Peñasco High School, Peñasco
Questa High School, Questa
Taos High School, Taos

Torrance County
Estancia High School, Estancia
Moriarty High School, Moriarty
Mountainair High School, Mountainair

Union County
Clayton High School, Clayton 
Des Moines High School, Des Moines

Valencia County
Belen High School, Belen
Century High School, Los Lunas
Los Lunas High School, Los Lunas
School of Dreams Academy
Valencia High School, Los Lunas

See also 
List of school districts in New Mexico

External links 
List of high schools in New Mexico from SchoolTree.org

References

New Mexico
High schools